Francesco Acquaroli (born 25 September 1974, Macerata, Italy) is an Italian politician of the Brothers of Italy (FdI).

Education 
Following his graduation from high school, he studied economics and business administration at the University of Macerata.

Political career 
He began his political commitment at a very young age as a member of municipal council of Potenza Picena.

In the regional elections in the Marches in 2010 he was a candidate for the regions council on the list of The People of Freedom (PdL) in support of the candidate for president Erminio Marinelli, resulting elected. He soon left the PdL and became a member of the newly founded Brothers of Italy following which his friendship with the leader of Brothers of Italy Giorgia Meloni began.

In 2014, Acquaroli was a candidate for Mayor of Potenza Picena and was elected on the 8 June 2014. Following his election as Mayor, he resigned from his post as a member of the regional council. In the parliamentary elections of 2018, he was elected deputy of the Brothers of Italy. Following his election he resigned from the office of Mayor of Potenza Picena in June 2018.

On 22 June 2020  he was  proposed as the Brothers of Italy candidate for the presidency of the Marche in the 2020 regional elections within a center-right coalition of BdI, Lega Nord and Forza Italia. He was elected the president of Marche on the 20 September 2020.

Personal life 
He is married to Lucia Appignanesi and is a fan of Inter Milan. He also has a brother.

March on Rome Dinner controversy 
On the 28 October  2019 Francesco Aquaroli was present at a dinner in Acquasanta Terme organized by the provincial secretary of FdI to celebrate the March on Rome led by Benito Mussolini in 1922. The march on Rome was the beginning of the fascist dictatorship in Italy. Together with Acquaroli, the mayor of Ascoli Piceno Marco Fioravanti was also present at that dinner.

References 

1974 births
The People of Freedom politicians
Brothers of Italy politicians
Deputies of Legislature XVIII of Italy
Living people
Marche Polytechnic University alumni